The 2005 Categoría Primera A season was the 58th season of Colombia's top-flight football league. Atlético Nacional won the Campeonato Apertura and Deportivo Cali won the Campeonato Finalizacion.

Campeonato Apertura 
The Copa Mustang 2005-I is the first tournament of the year. This season included the new team Boyacá Chicó; changing its name from Chico FC, they also moved to Tunja from Bogotá. The season began on February 12, and concluded on June 26.

First stage

Standings

Fixtures

Semifinals 
The second phase of the 2005-I tournament consisted of two groups of 4 teams. This was disputed by the best eight teams from the first phase of the tournament. The winners of each group face in the finals to define a champion.

Group A

Group B

Finals

Campeonato Finalización 
The Copa Mustang 2005-II was the second tournament of the year. The season began on July 10 and finished December 18.

First stage

Standings

Fixtures

Semifinals 

The second phase of the 2006 tournament consisted of two groups of 4 teams. This was disputed by the best eight teams from the first phase of the tournament. The winners of each group face on in the finals to define a champion.

Group A

Group B

Finals

Relegated and Promoted Team(s)

External links 
 Copa Mustang Official Page
 Dimayor Official Page
 website
 Colombia 2005 at RSSSF

Categoría Primera A seasons
1
Col